Dichromia thermesialis is a moth of the family Erebidae first described by Francis Walker in 1866. It is found in India, Sri Lanka, China, Sumatra, Borneo and New Guinea.

Forewings dark blackish grey. There is an obscurely darker, transverse antemedial. Whitish postmedial is slightly triarcuate. Apical lens obscure. Caterpillar cylindrical with slightly tapering ends. Head shiny, pale yellowish with brown freckles. Setae are on black chalazae. Body dull blackish. Faint white subdorsal, lateral and subspiracular lines visible. Larval host plants are Pouzolzia species.

References

Moths of Asia
Moths described in 1866
Erebidae
Hypeninae